The 1993 FIVB World Grand Prix was the first edition of the women's volleyball tournament, annually arranged by FIVB. It was played by eight countries from 28 May to 30 June 1993. The final round was staged in Hong Kong.

Preliminary rounds

Ranking
The top six teams in the preliminary round advance to the Final round.

|}

First round

Group A
Venue: Seoul, South Korea

|}

Group B
Venue: Tokyo, Japan

|}

Second round

Group C
Venue: Bangkok, Thailand

|}

Group D
Venue: Kuala Lumpur, Malaysia

|}

Third round

Group E
Venue: Sydney, Australia

|}

Group F
Venue: Taipei, Taiwan

|}

Final round
Venue: Hong Kong

Pool play

Group G

|}

|}

Group H

|}

|}

Final four

3rd place match

|}

Final

|}

Final standings

See also
1993 FIVB World League

Individual awards
Most Valuable Player: 
Best Scorer: 
Best Spiker: 
Best Blocker: 
Best Server: 
Best Setter: 
Best Receiver:

Dream Team
Middle Blockers:
 

 

Opposite Hitter:

Setter:

 

Outside Hitter:

References

Volleyball Almanac

1993
FIVB Volleyball World Grand Prix
1993 in Hong Kong sport
International volleyball competitions hosted by Hong Kong